The Center for NanoScience (CeNS) was founded in 1998 at the Ludwig-Maximilians-University (LMU) in Munich. Its aim is to promote, bundle and join interdisciplinary research in the field of nanoscience in the Munich area. CeNS is an association of working groups from basic research and industry and acts as a network which connects various institutions from a variety of disciplines. The members cooperate in a horizontal structure based on voluntary commitment, and are supported by a small coordination team.

CeNS consolidates research activities at the nanometer scale from physics, chemistry, biochemistry, and medicine. The CeNS network promotes the mutual understanding and the collaboration between these disciplines by joint seminars, workshops, and schools.

See also

References

External links 
Center for NanoScience

Ludwig Maximilian University of Munich
Nanotechnology institutions
1998 establishments in Germany
Research institutes established in 1998
Research institutes in Munich